Sparianthis is a genus of Colombian huntsman spiders, first described by Eugène Louis Simon in 1880.

Species 
 it contains the following thirteen species:

 Sparianthis accentuata (Caporiacco, 1955) — Venezuela
 Sparianthis beebei Rheims, 2020 — Trinidad and Tobago
 Sparianthis boraris Rheims, 2020 — Brazil
 Sparianthis caracarai Rheims, 2020 — Brazil
 Sparianthis chickeringi (Gertsch, 1941) — Panama
 Sparianthis crulsi (Mello-Leitão, 1930) — Trinidad and Tobago, French Guiana, Brazil
 Sparianthis granadensis (Keyserling, 1880) — Colombia
 Sparianthis humaita Rheims, 2020 — Brazil
 Sparianthis juazeiro Rheims, 2020 — Brazil
 Sparianthis juruti Rheims, 2020 — Brazil
 Sparianthis megalopalpa (Caporiacco, 1954) — Ecuador, French Guiana
 Sparianthis picta (Simon, 1887) — Peru, Brazil
 Sparianthis ravida (Simon, 1898) — St. Vincent and the Grenadines, Guyana, Ecuador, Peru, Brazil

See also
 List of Sparassidae species

References

Sparassidae
Spiders of South America